Richard George Arthur Barclay,  (7 December 1919 – 17 July 1942) was a Royal Air Force fighter pilot and flying ace of the Second World War. He was killed in action during the First Battle of El Alamein.

Early life
Barclay was born in South London on 7 December 1919; his father Gilbert was an Anglican rector, and his mother Dorothy the daughter of missionary CT Studd and his family home for most of his childhood was in the rectory at Great Holland, on the Essex coast. He attended Hawtreys preparatory school, Stowe School, and Trinity College, Cambridge, and joined the University Air Squadron in 1938.

Second World War
Called up on the outbreak of war, and posted to No. 249 Squadron RAF in July 1940, he flew through the Battle of Britain, receiving the Distinguished Flying Cross (DFC) in October. During the Battle of Britain, his diary records that he could see his house while flying from RAF North Weald.

Barclay's DFC citation from November 1940 reads:

As a flight commander with No. 611 Squadron RAF, Barclay was shot down over occupied France in September 1941. He force landed and evaded capture, making his way to Spain with help from the French Resistance. In April 1942 he was posted to North Africa and returned to flying as CO of No. 238 Squadron RAF, flying Hawker Hurricanes Mk II's.

He was shot down and killed by Werner Schröer of III./Jagdgeschwader 27 on 17 July 1942. He is buried at the El Alamein War Cemetery, Egypt. Barclay's older brother Charles, an army officer, was killed in 1944.

His diaries, written during his wartime career up until his death, were published in 1974 and  give a rare, descriptive and highly articulate first hand account of the life of a fighter pilot in 1940–41. An expanded edition was published in 2012.

Bibliography
 Barclay, George. (1977). Angels 22: A Self-Portrait of a Fighter Pilot. [Paperback], [Revised Edition]. Arrow Books.  or

References

1920 births
1942 deaths
People educated at Stowe School
Royal Air Force squadron leaders
Recipients of the Distinguished Flying Cross (United Kingdom)
Royal Air Force personnel killed in World War II
Royal Air Force pilots of World War II
Aviators killed by being shot down
Alumni of Trinity College, Cambridge
The Few
People educated at Hawtreys
Military personnel from London